Vernon W. "Vern" Holschbach (October 17, 1926April 28, 2014) was an American bricklayer and Democratic politician.  He represented Manitowoc County in the Wisconsin State Assembly for 12 years (1981–1993).

Biography
Born in Manitowoc, Wisconsin, Holschbach graduated from Lincoln High School and attended Manitowoc County's Lakeshore Technical College.  He was employed as a bricklayer and mason and became an active member of the International Union of Bricklayers and Allied Craftworkers, and was elected president of the local.

He was elected to the Manitowoc County Board of Supervisors in 1968 and served until his election to the Assembly in 1980.  He served in the Assembly until 1993.

References

External links
 Holschbach, Vernon W. 1926 at Wisconsin Historical Society

1926 births
2014 deaths
County supervisors in Wisconsin
Democratic Party members of the Wisconsin State Assembly
People from Manitowoc, Wisconsin
20th-century American politicians
American bricklayers